Cherum may refer to:
A plum-cherry hybrid
Cherrun, Iran